Jessica Levinson is an American law professor and political commentator. Levinson teaches at Loyola Law School in Los Angeles, where she lectures in the areas of constitutional law, election law and privacy torts.

Life and career
Levinson attended Marlborough School before going to Loyola Marymount University and graduating as the class valedictorian. Levinson graduated cum laude from Loyola Law School where she was the Senior Articles Editor of the Loyola of Los Angeles International and Comparative Law Review. Levinson served as a law clerk to the Honorable James V. Selna of the Central District of California following graduation. Prior to joining Loyola Law School as a full-time faculty member she practiced with the law firm of Simpson Thacher & Bartlett LLP and served as the Director of Political Reform at the Center for Governmental Studies.

Levinson has also published a number of law review articles. These articles discuss issues related to campaign finance law, corporate personhood, ballot access and ballot initiatives.

References

Publications

Peer-reviewed articles 
 Levinson, J.A., 2012. The Original Sin of Campaign Finance Law: Why Buckley v. Valeo is Wrong. University of Richmond Law Review, 47, pp. 881–937.
 Levin, J.A., 2011. We the Corporations: The Constitutionality of Limitations on Corporate Electoral Speech after Citizens United. University of San Francisco Law Review, 46, pp. 307–358.
 Levinson, J.A., 2010. Timing is Everything: A New Model for Countering Corruption without Silencing Speech in Elections. St. Louis University Law Journal, 55, pp. 853–886.
 Levinson, J.A. and Stern, R.M., 2009. Ballot Box Budgeting in California: The Bane of the Golden State or an Overstated Problem? Hastings Constitutional Law Quarterly, 37(4), pp. 689–744.

External links 
 Jessica Levinson faculty page.
 Jessica Levinson Twitter.

California lawyers
Living people
Loyola Marymount University faculty
American women lawyers
Loyola Marymount University alumni
Year of birth missing (living people)
American women academics
21st-century American women